Qingdao West Coast Football Club is a professional Chinese football club that currently participates in the China League One. The team is based in Qingdao, Shandong.

History
Qingdao Kangtaiyuan F.C. was founded in 2007 by Qingdao Kangtine Commercial Concrete Co., Ltd. as a company football team for their employees. The club would initially participate in local amateur and futsal tournaments until the 2011 league season when they participated in the Qingdao Football Association Cup and were knocked out in the last sixteen. The following season, they joined the Chinese football league pyramid in the second tier of the Qingdao League or seventh tier overall.

In 2017, after a third place finish in the Qingdao City League, they changed their English name to Qingdao Kangtine and participated in the China Amateur Football League for the first time. They advanced to the national play-offs after finishing first in their group but was eliminated by Qinghai Zhuangbo in the first round.

In 2018, they were crowned champions of the Qingdao City League, and participated in the rebranded Chinese Champions League again. However, they were eliminated by Taizhou Yuanda in the regional group stage play-offs and failed to advance to the national play-offs.

In 2019, they changed their name to Qingdao Zhongchuang Hengtai, and in their third attempt at the highest level of amateur football league, they were eliminated, once again, by Shandong Wangyue in the group stage play-offs, but were later admitted into the national stage after the withdrawal of Huizhou Huixin from it. They eventually achieved the 8th rank and was admitted into China League Two for the first time in its history. They also won the Qingdao League Cup and Super Cup that year.

In January 2021, they changed their name to Qingdao Youth Island. They finished 4th this season and entered the promotion-relegation play-offs against Beijing BIT, who finished 17th in the 2021 China League One. Qingdao won 5-4 on penalties after drawing 2-2 on aggregate, promoting it to the China League One for the first time in club history.

In March 2023, they changed their name to Qingdao West Coast.

Name history
2007–2017: Qingdao Kangtaiyuan F.C. (青岛康太源)
2017–2018: Qingdao Kangtine F.C. (青岛康太源)
2019–2020: Qingdao Zhongchuang Hengtai F.C. (青岛中创恒泰)
2021–2022: Qingdao Youth Island F.C. (青岛青春岛)
2023–: Qingdao West Coast F.C. (青岛西海岸)

Players

Current squad

Coaching staff

Managerial history

Results

References

External links
Club website at ktyfootball.com

Football clubs in China
Association football clubs established in 2007
Sport in Qingdao
2007 establishments in China